Death Valley Airport may refer to:

Furnace Creek Airport, in Death Valley National Park, California, United States (FAA: L06)
Stovepipe Wells Airport, in Death Valley National Park, California, United States (FAA: L09)